Sport Huambo e Benfica, originally Sport Nova Lisboa e Benfica or Benfica de Nova Lisboa, later renamed as Sport Huambo e Benfica or Benfica do Huambo or Mambroa, is a football club from Huambo, Angola. The club was established as the then Nova Lisboa affiliate of S.L. Benfica of Portugal, and shares the same colours. The logo is also very similar to the Portuguese one.

In 1972, the club won the Angolan provincial football championship.

Following the country's independence in 1975 and in an attempt by the communist regime to erase all traces of colonial rule, the club which has been created as an affiliate to S.L. Benfica was ordered to change its name and therefore became known as Estrela Vermelha do Huambo (Huambo Red Star) as it participated in the first edition of the country's post-independence premier league and later on to Mambroa. In a General Assembly meeting held on March 10, 1990, the club's name was reverted to its original denomination, and since shortly after independence, the Portuguese-named city of Nova Lisboa had changed to Huambo, so did the club's name.

Achievements
Angolan League: 1
 1972

League & Cup Positions

Stadium
The club is the owner of the 15,000-seat Estádio das Cacilhas stadium. At present, the stadium has been demolished, awaiting government funding for the construction of a new stadium on the same site, with the capacity of 15,000 seats.

Manager history and performance

Players

2007–2011

1979–1990

See also
 Girabola
 Gira Angola

External links
 Facebook profile

References

 RSSSF
 RSSSF
 RSSSF
 RSSSF
 RSSSF

Benfica
Huambo
Association football clubs established in 1931
1931 establishments in Angola